Live at the Playroom may refer to:

Live at the Playroom (Airbourne album)
Live at the Playroom (Kate Miller-Heidke EP)
Live at the Playroom (Kisschasy album)